The Sirhind Canal is a large irrigation canal that carries water from the Sutlej River in Punjab state, India. It is one of the oldest and biggest irrigation works in the Indus river system, and was inaugurated in 1882 CE. The canal begins at Ropar headworks near Ropar city in Rupnagar district of Punjab.

Geography of the canal
The Sirhind Canal begins at Ropar and heads southwest to Doraha in Ludhiana district. At Doraha, the canal splits into three: the Abohar branch, the Bathinda branch and the Patiala branch. Each of these further subdivides extensively to irrigate a large swathe of the Malwa region of Punjab. Once a partially arid zone, this area is now extremely fertile due to the water distributed by the canal network.

See also
Sutlej River
Sirhind

References

Canals in Punjab, India
Canals opened in 1882
Fatehgarh Sahib district